Faculty of Language and History – Geography (abbreviated DTCF) is a school of the Ankara University, Turkey. It doesn't have a common campus with the Ankara University. The architect of the building was Bruno Taut.

The school was founded in 1935 before the establishment of Ankara University. In 1946 it was included in the newly established Ankara University.

Departments
There are 19 departments of the school. These are:
Anthropology
Archaeology
Linguistics
Ancient languages and culture
Turkic languages and literature 
Turkish language and literature
Western languages and literature 
Eastern languages and literature
Caucasus languages and culture
Slavic languages and literature
History
Geography
Philosophy
Psychology
Sociology
Information and documentation
Ethnology
Art history
Drama

References

Ankara University
1935 establishments in Turkey
Educational institutions established in 1935